The Désix is a river in the south of France. Its source is in  Fenolheda, near Aussières peak. It flows through Rabouillet, Sournia, Pézilla-de-Conflent, Felluns and Trilla before it empties into the Agly near Ansignan .

Tributaries
 Matassa

References

Rivers of France
Rivers of Aude
Rivers of Pyrénées-Orientales
Rivers of Occitania (administrative region)